Khamsavath Vilayphone (born 9 April 1967) is a Laotian boxer. He competed in the men's light welterweight event at the 1992 Summer Olympics.

References

1967 births
Living people
Laotian male boxers
Olympic boxers of Laos
Boxers at the 1992 Summer Olympics
Place of birth missing (living people)
Boxers at the 1998 Asian Games
Asian Games competitors for Laos
Light-welterweight boxers